Acrocercops laciniella (blackbutt leafminer) is a moth of the family Gracillariidae. In Australia, it is known from the states of New South Wales, Queensland, Victoria, South Australia and Tasmania. It is also known from India and has recently been found in New Zealand.

The wingspan is about 10 mm.

The larvae feed on Eucalyptus species, including Eucalyptus eugenioides, Eucalyptus pilularis, Eucalyptus piperita, Eucalyptus salignus and Eucalyptus triantha. They mine the leaves of their host plant. The mine has the form of a large, irregular blotch in juvenile leaves.

References

laciniella
Moths of Asia
Moths of Oceania
Moths described in 1880